Gary Andrew Younge ,  (born January 1969) is a British journalist, author, broadcaster and academic. He was editor-at-large for The Guardian newspaper, which he joined in 1993. In November 2019, it was announced that Younge had been appointed as professor of sociology at the University of Manchester and would be leaving his post at The Guardian, where he was a columnist for two decades, although he continued to write for the newspaper. He also writes for the New Statesman.

Younge is the author of the books No Place Like Home (2002), Stranger in a Strange Land (2006), Who Are We – And Should It Matter in the 21st Century? (2011), The Speech: The Story Behind Dr. Martin Luther King Jr.'s Dream (2013) and Another Day in the Death of America (2016).

Early years and education
Younge grew up in Stevenage, Hertfordshire, where he was born. He is of Barbadian extraction.

In 1984, aged 15, he briefly joined the Young Socialists, the youth section of the Workers Revolutionary Party, but left a year later after harassment from other party members, including allegedly being accused of working for MI5 and claims that he supported Fidel Castro only because of his ethnicity. At the age of 17, Younge went to teach English in a United Nations Eritrean refugee school in Sudan with the educational charity Project Trust.

From 1987 to 1992, he attended Heriot-Watt University in Edinburgh, where he studied French and Russian, and was elected Vice President (Welfare) of the Student Association, a paid sabbatical post he held for a year.

Career
In his final year at university he was awarded a bursary from The Guardian to study journalism at City University, and after a short internship at Yorkshire Television he joined The Guardian in 1993, and has since reported from all over Europe, Africa, the US and the Caribbean.

His book, No Place like Home, in which he retraced the route of the civil rights Freedom Riders, was published in 1999 and was shortlisted for the Guardian First Book Award. His subsequent books are Stranger in a Strange Land: Encounters in the Disunited States (2006), Who Are We – And Should It Matter in the 21st Century? (2011), The Speech: The Story Behind Dr. Martin Luther King Jr.'s Dream (2013), and most recently Another Day in the Death of America: A Chronicle of Ten Short Lives (2016), a "deeply affecting" account of everyday fatalities among young people across the US, which in 2017 won the J. Anthony Lukas Book Prize from Columbia Journalism School and the Nieman Foundation for Journalism. Younge has also wrote a monthly column for The Nation, "Beneath the Radar".

In the 2020 and 2021 Powerlist, Younge was listed in the Top 100 of the most influential people in the UK from African/African-Caribbean descent. The same year saw Younge become professor of sociology at Manchester University. In addition, Younge is on the 2020 list of 100 Great Black Britons.

Personal life
In 2011 he relocated to Chicago, where he lived with his immediate family until returning to UK in 2015. In 2015, he announced his intention to move to Hackney, with his wife and two children. His brother Pat Younge was chief creative officer of BBC Vision, becoming Chair of Council at Cardiff University in 2022.

Awards and honours
2007: Honorary doctorate from Heriot-Watt University
2007: Honorary doctorate from London South Bank University
2009: James Cameron Award for the "combined moral vision and professional integrity" of his coverage of the Barack Obama election campaign
2015: Foreign Commentator of the Year by The Comment Awards
2015: David Nyhan Prize for political journalism from Harvard University's Shorenstein Center
2016: Sandford Award, "for radio, TV and online programmes that reflect religious, spiritual or ethical themes"
2016: Fellow of the Academy of Social Sciences (FAcSS)
2017: Honorary doctorate from Cardiff University
2017: James Aaronson Career Achievement Award from Hunter College, City University of New York
2020: Powerlist of the Top 100 most influential people in the UK of African/African-Caribbean descent.
2020: 100 Great Black Britons
2021: Elected a Fellow of the Royal Society of Literature

Bibliography

References

External links
 
 Twitter
 Column archive at The Guardian
 Memoirs of a teenage Trot, The Guardian, 19 February 2000
 Column archive at The Nation
 
 
 Article archive at Journalisted
 

1969 births
Living people
British male journalists
British travel writers
The Guardian journalists
Alumni of City, University of London
Alumni of Heriot-Watt University
Black British writers
British republicans
English socialists
The Nation (U.S. magazine) people
Workers Revolutionary Party (UK) members
People from Hitchin
People from Stevenage
British people of Barbadian descent
Fellows of the Academy of Social Sciences
Writers from Chicago
21st-century British journalists
21st-century British male writers
Fellows of the Royal Society of Literature
Male non-fiction writers